The Roland JD-990 Super JD is a module version of Roland JD-800 synthesizer with expanded capabilities, which was released in 1993. JD-990 is a multitimbral synthesizer utilizing 'wave-table' sample-based synthesis technology. It is equipped with 6 MB of ROM containing sampled PCM waveforms, four sets of stereo outputs that are assignable to individual, internal, instruments, and standard MIDI in/out/through ports. JD-990 has a large LCD display and programming takes place through a keypad on the front panel of the unit. The unit can generate multi-timbral sounds reminiscent of the vintage analogue synthesizers but is also capable of generation of modern digital textures. There are several expansion boards available for JD-990 that can be installed in the provided expansion slot in the chassis of the unit.

Features
The JD-990 had the following features which were not available on the JD-800:
 Expanded wave ROM (6 MB vs. 3 MB)
 Ability to use an 8 MB expansion board from the SR-JV80 series
 JV-80 patch import
 4 additional outputs
 True stereo engine
 Individual panning of each tone in a patch
 Oscillator sync
 Frequency cross-modulation (FXM)
 Matrix Modulation
 Modulation of the same destination from multiple sources
 Oscillator structures that allow ring modulation and serial dual filters
 Additional LFO waveforms: sine, trapezoid and chaos
 MIDI CC control of parameters
 Tempo sync delay
 Polyphonic portamento
 Analog Feel. Adds a very subtle pitch modulation to the basic waveforms intended to recreate an analogue synth's 'drift'
 Performance memories
 Additional multitimbral slots
 One patch can keep full effects in multi mode

Expandability
The JD-990 is compatible with the following:
 The SR-JV80 series of expansion boards. The SR-JV80-04 Vintage Synth board includes 255 patches programmed specially for the JD-990.
 The SL-JD80 series of waveform & patch cards released for the JD-800.
 The SO-PCM1 series of waveform cards.
 The JD9D series of patch cards developed specifically for the JD-990.

Factory Sounds
The Factory presets of the JD-990 were created by Eric Persing and Adrian Scott.

Notable users
The JD-990 has been used by artists such as Klaus Schulze, Paul Shaffer, Steve Duda, Vangelis, The Prodigy, Apollo 440, ATB, and Mirwais. Apollo 440 used the JD-990 for atmospheric sounds on the track "The Machine in the Ghost", on the album Gettin' High on Your Own Supply. On the Faithless song "Insomnia", the pizzicato hook is from a JD-990, with added reverb.

References

Further reading

External links
 Profile on Vintage Synth Explorer
 Roland JD-990 mp3 sound demos at SynthMania
 Polynominal JD-990 audio demos, manual and info
 MP3 demo of the JD-990, by Tomislav Babic
 Roland JD-990 Part 1 by Michaël Larouche, Demo on Youtube
 Roland JD-990 Owner's Manual

JD-990
Digital synthesizers
Polyphonic synthesizers